Durham Turnpike railway station served the towns of Birtley (historically County Durham, now Tyne and Wear) and Chester-le-Street as well as the village of South Pelaw in County Durham, England. The station was on the Stanhope and Tyne Railway and opened in 1835, only to close in 1853. It reopened in 1862 along with nearby Vigo but closed again in 1869. The line remained open for passenger services until 1955 and to freight until the 1980s.

The line and station site now form the Consett and Sunderland Railway Path between Chester-le-Street and Washington. The station straddles the border between the modern-day counties of County Durham and Tyne and Wear. The station despite its namesake, did not serve the city of Durham which was eight miles southwest from the station.

References

External links 

Disused railway stations in Tyne and Wear
Disused railway stations in County Durham
Former North Eastern Railway (UK) stations
Railway stations in Great Britain opened in 1835
Railway stations in Great Britain closed in 1862
1835 establishments in England